Manjeri Narayanan Nambiar (7 March 1919 – 19 November 2008) was an Indian actor who worked predominantly in Tamil cinema, known mostly for his villain roles in an eight decade long career. He has also appeared in a few Malayalam films.

He appeared in many  MGR  movies as a villain. Some of the famous ones include Enga Veettu Pillai, Aayirathil Oruvan, Nadodi Mannan, Naalai Namadhe, Padagotti, Thirudathe, En Annan, Kaavalkaaran and Kudiyirundha Koyil.

Early life
Manjeri Narayan Nambiar was born on 7 March 1919 at Kandakkai near Mayyil in Cannanore (Kannur) in North Malabar region of Kerala.  He was the son of Kelu Nambiar and Manjeri Kalyani Amma. While he was still a child, his father died. He later moved to live and study in Ooty with his elder sister and brother-in-law. He became interested in acting when he was 13 and he joined Nawab Rajamanikkam's troupe. He learnt discipline here which is according to him the major life skill at Madurai Bala nada vinodha kana sabha. From then on acting became the only thing that occupied him. His first film was Bhaktha Ramadoss, shot in 1935 in Hindi and Tamil, where he played as a comedian along with T.K.Sampangi.

Film career
Though he started as a hero, Nambiar soon started donning the role of a villain — so much so that today his name is synonymous with villainy in Kollywood. Nambiar has worked with seven generations of actors. His first pay was Rs.3 with Boys Company. He would retain Rs.1 and send Rs.2 to his mother. A man of very limited needs, he has never eaten food not cooked by his wife, Rugmini Nambiar.

He made quite a statement in the early 50s with his portrayal of 11 roles in Digambara Samiyar, one of his films as the Lead. His arresting performance in films such as Manthiri Kumari, Velaikaari, Ayirathil Oruvan, Thillana Mohanambal, Missiyamma and Nenjam Marappadillai paved way for a very successful career that spanned over five decades.

A majority of the more than 1000 films that he has done is in Tamil, though he has acted in Telugu, Malayalam and Hindi, besides an English film `The Jungle' (with Rod Cameron, the film's hero, directed by William Burke) in which he appears in a few brief scenes. The film was released in 1952. The Hindi film he acted in was a remake of the Tamil Kanavane Kankanda Deivam. After becoming popular in Tamil films he started his own drama troupe called Nambiar Nataka Mandram. They staged two plays — `Kaviyin Kanavu' and a comedy play `Kalyana Supermarket.'

M.N.Nambiar was that rare contradictory personality - a cruel, charming villain on the silver screen while being a very pious man in real life. He was also a pure vegetarian and teetotaler. He was also an ardent devotee of Sabarimala Sri Ayyappan. He has had a long association with the temple, and visited the shrine more than 65 times over the last half a century; this has led to him being called Maha Guruswamy. His colleagues noted that he died during the famous Sabarimala season and it may be due to the blessing of his Lord.

His favourite films remain `Aayirathil Oruvan' with MGR, `Ambikapathi' with Sivaji Ganesan, `Missiyamma' with Gemini Ganesan, `Nenjam Marappathillai' directed by Sridhar and `Thooral Ninu Pochu' with Bhagyaraj. This was the film that made him do character roles, something that he continued to do till his death. He also acted as hero in two films `Kalyani' and `Kavitha' produced by Modern Theaters. He has done stage, films and also acted on TV dramas like 'Oviyam' and Velan. When it comes to acting, he supposedly likes all the actors; but of special mention are M. R. Radha and Savitri. Both, in his opinion, were brilliant in their own way.

Partial filmography

Television
 Alaigal as Father (Acha)
 Velan 
 Oviyam
 The TV serial Avalukkendru oru idam in Doordharshan Madras is his first Television debut. The television serial produced by Lakshmi and Lakshmi Creations fetched him the Mylapore Academy Award 1991 for Best Actor in Character Role.

Death
Nambiar suffered from bacterial infection and died at his residence in Chennai on 19 November 2008. He was survived by his wife Rugmini Amma, 2 sons — one, a senior BJP leader Sukumar Nambiar, and the other, Mohan Nambiar, a prominent businessman based in Coimbatore and a daughter, Sneha Nambiar. His eldest son Sukumar Nambiar died on 8 January 2012 aged 63 and later , his wife Rugmini Amma also died on 11 April 2012 aged 82.

Tributes
 P. Vasu (Director) :
"If there was anyone who could act with both the top heroes (Sivaji Ganesan and M. G. R.) of Tamil cinema then, it was Nambiar. At one point, directors could not think of anyone else but him to play villain."

 Srikanth (Actor) :
"This is a very big loss...you cannot find a human being like him easily."

 Manorama (Actress) :
"He was a villain only when the camera got rolling...otherwise, he’d always keep us laughing with his ready wit,"

 K. Raman (Make-up man) :
"In ‘Nenjam Marappadillai,’ he plays a really old man...the makeup would take hours together, but he would be extremely patient. His skin was flawless and almost pink...he took great care of his health."

 Sundaram (Dance master) :
"Nambiar swami was responsible for taking most of us in the industry to Sabarimalai"

 J. Jayalalithaa (Former Tamilnadu CM) :
"I have acted with him in several films. He would be very jovial and enthusiastic on the sets. When one worked with him, one forget the burden of work. He was very fond of me and I always had great regard and respect for him. His passing away is a great loss indeed."

References

 http://news.bbc.co.uk/2/hi/7737798.stm

External links
 
 

1919 births
2008 deaths
20th-century Indian male actors
Male actors from Kannur
Male actors in Malayalam cinema
Indian male film actors
21st-century Indian male actors
Male actors in Tamil cinema
Male actors in Telugu cinema
Tamil male television actors
Indian male television actors